Sollihøgda Chapel is "long church" dating from 1911 in Sollihøgda in the municipality of Hole in Viken county, Norway. The church is part of the Church of Norway and it belongs to the deanery of Ringerike in the Diocese of Tunsberg.

The church is built of wood and can accommodate 100 people. It was designed by the architect Herman Major Backer (1856–1932). It can be reached from Kapellveien (Chapel Road), which turns off of European route E16 at the bridge marked Ringeriksporten 'Gateway to Ringerike'.

References

External links
 Sollihøgda Chapel at Norges kirker
 Sollihøgda Chapel at the Church of Norway
 Sollihøgda Chapel at the Norwegian Directorate for Cultural Heritage

Churches in Viken
Churches completed in 1911
1911 establishments in Norway